Ghana U23 football team (also known as Ghana Olympic football team or Black Meteors), represents Ghana in international football competitions in Olympic Games, All-Africa Games, and CAF U-23 Championship. The selection is limited to players aged 23 and under the age of 23, except during the Olympic Games where the use of three overage players is allowed. The team is controlled by the Ghana Football Association (GFA).

The team had qualified for five straight Olympic Games Football Tournaments when the tournament was still a full senior national team competition. In 1992, they became the first African country to win a medal at Olympic Games football. The Black Meteors failed to qualify for Beijing 2008 and although being the 2011 All-Africa Games champions, the Ghana Olympic football team failed to qualify for the 2011 CAF U-23 Championship, thus did not participate in London 2012.

History
Ghana appeared in the quarter-final of the Olympic Games in 1964 where they were beaten by Romania in the quarter-final. They played in the 1968, 1972 Olympic tournaments, but never progressed further than the Group stages. They also qualified in 1976 then withdrew.

In 1992, Ghana reached the semi-final for the first time, they defeated Australia 2-0 to claim their first bronze medal in the event, and thus became the first African country to win a medal at football.

Ghana reached the quarter-finals of the Olympics football tournament in 1996 for the second time, they lost 4–2 against Brazil.

In the Athens 2004 tournament Ghana were eliminated in the Group stages after they lost a must win game 1–0 against Japan. The team were not able to qualify for Beijing 2008 and London 2012.

Results and fixtures

Legend

2021

Ghana under-23 Results and Fixtures – Soccerway.com
Ghana Results and Fixtures – FIFA.com

Coaching staff

Current coaching staff

Source: Ghana Football Association

Manager history
 after the match against .

Players

Current squad
 The following players were called up for the 2023 Africa U-23 Cup of Nations qualification matches.
 Match dates: 23 and 30 October 2022
 Opposition: 
Caps and goals correct as of: 15 June 2021, after the match against

Previous squads
African Games
2011 All-Africa Games – squad
Africa U-23 Cup of Nations

 2019 Africa U-23 Cup of Nations – squads

Competitive record

Olympic Games

Note: Football at the Summer Olympics has been an under-23 tournament since 1992.

African Games

Note: Football at the All-Africa Games has been an under-23 tournament since 1991.

See also
Sport in Ghana
Football in Ghana
Women's football in Ghana
Ghana national football team
Ghana national under-20 football team
Ghana national under-17 football team
Ghana women's national football team

References

External links

Ghana national under-23 football team (Black Meteors) – official website 

Under-23
African national under-23 association football teams